Wyoming Highway 89 (WYO 89) is a north-south state road that jumps in and out of Wyoming three times, and runs through the western edges of and Uinta County, Wyoming and Lincoln County, Wyoming.

The portion in the state of Utah is known as Utah State Route 16 and Utah State Route 30. The only other routes that jump in and out of the state are U.S. Route 212 along the Beartooth Highway near Yellowstone National Park and Highway 230, which runs through the "Three Way Junction"  of Colorado State Highways 125 and 127 south of the Snowy Range Mountains.

Route description
Wyoming Highway 89 follows State Control Route 10 for its entire length.

Southern segment
Wyoming Highway 89 has two different segments to its route. The first starts at I-80 / US 189 (Exit 5) and Highway 150 in Evanston. (The roadway continues south of I-80/US 189 as WYO 150 to the Utah border). From Exit 5, WYO 89 heads north as Front Street into downtown Evanston. At , Highway 89 turns north onto Highway 89 north. From here, WYO 89 runs concurrent for a short distance with I-80 Business/US 189 Business until it intersects Bear River Drive where the business routes turn east.  As Highway 89 leaves Evanston behind the roadway heads northwest. The highway passes through the former coal mining camp of Almy and reaches the Town of Bear River just before reaching the Utah state line. Bear River is one of Wyoming's newest towns, being incorporated in 2001. Just after leaving Bear River, WYO 89 temporarily ends at Utah State Route 16.

Utah connection

The roadway continues as Utah SR 16.

Northern segment
The northern segment of Wyoming Highway 89 begins at Utah State Route 30 at the Utah-Wyoming state line west of Sage, Wyoming. WYO 89 travels northeast to US 30 at Sage. Here, WYO 89 turns north to join US 30 as it heads north

WYO 89 runs concurrent with US 30 for almost  from Sage through Cokeville, north to one-half mile east of the Idaho-Wyoming state line. This section is also known as the Emigrant Trail. At , US 30/WYO 89 intersects WYO 231 (E. Main St.) and WYO 232 in the Town of Cokeville. From there WYO 89 continues with US 30 north. At , WYO 89 ends its concurrency with US 30 near Border Junction.

Wyoming Highway 89 heads north from U.S. Route 30 as it continues westward.

History
According to an original network map of Wyoming State Highways, this route was defined as Wyoming Highway 65 in 1924. With the introduction of US routes in 1926, the route between Cokeville and Star Valley was renamed Highway 89, while the section south of Sage remained designated as Highway 65. This was done in the hopes that US 89 would be extended north into Wyoming. US 89 was extended in 1936 along old Highway 287. Highway 89 was recommissioned as Highway 91 to avoid confusion between the two highways, while Highway 65 kept its original number. However, within a few years, US 89 was rerouted to its current route in Utah and Idaho, and US 189 was created along old Highway 287. As a result, Wyoming recommissioned Highway 89 over both Highway 65 and Highway 91.

Major intersections

 Mileage shown above asterisk indicates mileage in Utah via Utah State Route 16, Utah State Route 30

See also

 List of state highways in Wyoming
 List of highways numbered 89

References

 Official 2003 State Highway Map of Wyoming

External links 

 Wyoming State Routes
 WYO 89 - ID 61/Idaho State Line to US 30
 WYO 89 - US 30 to WYO 231/WYO 232
 WYO 89 - WYO 231/WYO 232 to US 30
 WYO 89 - US 30 to SR-30/Utah State Line
 WYO 89 - SR-16/Utah State Line to I-80 BUS/US 189 BUS
 WYO 89 - I-80 BUS/US 189 to I-80/US 189/WYO 150

Transportation in Uinta County, Wyoming
Transportation in Lincoln County, Wyoming
089
U.S. Route 89